Opomyza germinationis is a species of fly in the family Opomyzidae.

References

Further reading

External links

 
 

Opomyzidae
Flies described in 1758
Taxa named by Carl Linnaeus